Szechuan sauce may refer to:
Szechuan sauce (McDonald's), a dipping sauce created to promote the 1998 film Mulan
Szechuan cuisine, in the context of the cuisine of the Chinese province of Szechuan